Live in a World Full of Hate is a live album by Sick of It All. Confusion exists around when it was recorded and released, with some sources stating it was released in 1993. However, it was released in 1995 and recorded in 1994, live at a show in Berlin, Germany. The cover wrongly states that it was "Recorded live at The City Garden - New Jersey. Sep 26th 1993.", but the vocalist shouts "Let's go Berlin" during one song.

Track listing

 Injustice System  – 2:33
 It's Clobberin' Time  – 0:47
 Violent Generation  – 1:45
 Alone  – 1:57
 The Pain Strikes  – 3:11
 Shut Me Out  – 2:25
 Pushed Too Far  – 0:55
 Friends Like You  – 1:20
 Locomotive  – 2:50
 World Full Of Hate  – 2:25
 Just Look Around  – 2:48
 What's Going On  – 2:07
 Give Respect  – 1:24
 Disillusion  – 2:08
 No Labels  – 0:55
 Pete's Sake  – 0:49
 G.I. Joe Head Stomp  – 1:22
 We Want The Truth  – 2:32
 The Blood & The Sweat  – 1:42
 The Shield  – 2:44
 We Stand Alone  – 2:40
 Indust  – 2:36
 My Life  – 0:49
 Betray  – 2:52

References

1994 albums
East West Records albums
Albums produced by Billy Anderson (producer)
Sick of It All albums